Danker is a surname. Notable people with the surname include:

Darrien Bryan Danker (born 1996), Malaysian Music Video Director 
Eli Danker (born 1948), Israeli actor
Frederick William Danker (1920–2012), Greek lexicographer and New Testament scholar
Jean Danker (born 1978), Singaporean DJ, voiceover artist and actor
Ran Danker (born 1984), Israeli actor, singer and model, son of Eli
Tony Danker (born 1971), British businessman